The 1964–65 William & Mary Indians men's basketball team represented the College of William & Mary in intercollegiate basketball during the 1964–65 NCAA University Division men's basketball season. Under the eighth year of head coach Bill Chambers, the team finished the season 12–13 and 6–8 in the Southern Conference.

William & Mary played most of its home games on campus at Blow Gymnasium, with one home game played off campus at the Norfolk Municipal Auditorium in Norfolk, Virginia. This was the 60th season of the collegiate basketball program at William & Mary, whose nickname is now the Tribe.

The Indians finished in sixth place in the conference and qualified for the 1965 Southern Conference men's basketball tournament, held at the Charlotte Coliseum in Charlotte, North Carolina. William & Mary defeated The Citadel in the first round and VPI in the second round before falling, in double overtime, to fourth-seeded West Virginia in the championship game (67–70).

The Indians did not participate in a post-season tournament.

Schedule

|-
!colspan=9 style="background:#006400; color:#FFD700;"| Regular season

|-
!colspan=9 style="background:#006400; color:#FFD700;"| 1965 Southern Conference Basketball Tournament

Source

References

William & Mary Tribe men's basketball seasons
William and Mary
William and Mary
William and Mary